The 1906–07 Connecticut Aggies men's basketball team represented Connecticut Agricultural College, now the University of Connecticut, in the 1906–07 collegiate men's basketball season. The Aggies completed the season with a 5–7 overall record. The Aggies were members of the Athletic League of New England State Colleges where they ended the season with a 0–4 record.

Schedule 

|-
!colspan=12 style=""| Regular Season

Schedule Source:

References 

UConn Huskies men's basketball seasons
1906–07 Athletic League of New England State Colleges men's basketball season
1906 in sports in Connecticut
1907 in sports in Connecticut